Angelina Vidal (1847 – 1917) was a Portuguese writer, editor noted for her support of the republic, women's rights and education for women.

Life
Vidal was born in São José in 1847. Her parents were Joaquim Casimiro Júnior and Rita Adelaide de Jesus. Her father was married to Maria do Carmo Figueiredo and as a result she had a half-sister named Carlota Joaquina da Silva Faria who died in 1913. At the age of nine she was an orphan.

She married in 1872. Her work Death of Satan was published in 1879. After twelve years of her marriage she separated from her husband. Divorce was impossible and her husband gained the custody of their children. In 1886 she published To the Portuguese workers which encouraged workers to campaign for a 12-hour day as at that time the standard working day was 15 hours.

Her husband died in 1894.

In 1901 she faced financial hardship. She had to turn to the charity of tobacco workers. This was not short-term and she had to ask again 1904.

Death and legacy

Vidal died in Anjos. A plaque was placed on her house although it is believed that the date on the plaque is wrong.  She was one of the first women in Portugal who were concerned with women's subordinate status and in particular about improving the educational opportunities for Women in Portugal together with Francisca Wood, Alice Pestana, Carolina Michaëlis de Vasconcelos, Alice Moderno, Maria Amália Vaz de Carvalho, Antónia Pusich and Guiomar Torrezão. A street is named for her in Lisbon.

Works

Publications 
 Morte de Satan, (1879)
 A Noite do Espírito, (1887)
 Ícaro, (1902)
 Jesus no Templo, (1881)
 Jessa Helfmann às Mães, Lisbon (1881)
 O Marquês de Pombal à luz da Filosofia, Lisbon, (1882)
 O Ultrage. Dedicado ao Major de Quillinan, Lisbon, (1883)
 Folhas Soltas, (1887)
 A Provocação. Carta ao Rei, (1887)
 Arquivo Histórico. Narrativa da Fundação das Cidades e Vilas do Reino e seus Brasões de Armas, (1889)
 Ódio à Inglaterra, (1890)
 Protesto contra a Inglaterra, (1890)
 Justiça aos vencidos, (1890)
 Liquidando... Espirais de Dor, Lisbon, (1894)
 Nas Florestas da Vida, Lisbon, (1906)
 Semana da Paixão, (1906)
 Contos Negros, (1896)
 Lisboa Antiga e Lisboa Moderna. Elementos Históricos da sua Evolução, 3 vols., (1900-1903)
 Os Contos Vermelhos, (1904)
 Contos de Cristal, (1905)
 Evangelho da Instrução, (1907)
 Os Contos Cristalinos, (1907-1908)
 Abecedário do Amor, (1908)
 Avé Charitas! Ao grande coração de luz do ilustre sr. dr. Manuel d'Arriaga, Lisbon, (1912)

Plays 
 O Conselheiro Acácio (drama)
 Nobreza de Alma (drama)
 Lição Moral (drama)
 Caminho Errado (comedy)
 Castigar os que Erram (comedy)
 O Oitavo Mandamento (comedy)

Contributions to periodicals
 O Alarme
 Alma Feminina
 Anphion
 O Amigo da Infância
 O Arbitrador
 Bocage
 Cabeceirense
 Caixeiro
 Camões
 Capítulo
 Comarca de Arganil
 Comércio de Lisboa
 O Construtor
 Contemporâneo
 Courriers
 "Feminismo" A Crónica, 08/1906
 Democracia do Sul
 Diário Metalúrgico
 Domingo Ilustrado
 Eco Micaelense 
 Eco Popular
 Enciclopédia Republicana
 O Estado do Norte
 O Figueirense
 Folha da Tarde
 Folha do Sul
 Gabinete de Repórteres
 A Greve
 Ideia Nova
 Independência
 Liberdade
 Loarense
 A Luz
 Luz do Operário
 Luz e Vida
 Marselhesa
 O Mutualista
 Notícias do Dia
 A Obra
 Oficina
 O País
 Partido Operário
 Partido do Povo
 Portugal
 Porvir
 Produtor
 Protesto Operário: "Primeiro de Maio", 01/05/1892
 Radical
 A Resistência
 Revista Literária e Científica do Século
 Revolução
 O Século
 Sentinela da Fronteira
 Sul do Tejo
 O Tecido
 O Trabalhador
 O Trabalho
 Transmontano
 Tribuna
 Vanguarda
 Viseu Ilustrado
 A Voz do Operário (from | a partir de 1881): "Nilo" 17/08/1902
 Voz do Trabalho
 Vulcão

Contributions to almanacs 
 Almanaque de Lembranças Luso-Brasileiro, 1908
 Almanaque Republicano para 1880
 Almanque a Vitória da República para 1890, 1891, 1892
 Almanaque Socialista para 1897 e 1931
 Almanaque da Crónica
 Almanaque dos Repórteres

Private life
She married,  Luís Augusto de Campos Vidal, a Navy doctor in 1872. They had five children Julieta Casimiro Vidal (1873-1944), Violet Casimiro Vidal (1874-1916), Antonino Casimiro Vidal (1876-1912), Ema Casimiro Vidal (1879-1884) and Hugo Casimiro Vidal (1886-1940). Her estranged husband died in 1894.

References

1847 births
1917 deaths
People from Lisbon
19th-century Portuguese women writers
20th-century Portuguese women writers
19th-century Portuguese writers
20th-century Portuguese writers